Garen is a rare name Western Armenian given name

People
Garen Bloch (1978–2018), South African
Garen Boyajian (born 1987), Canadian actor
Garen Casey, Australian 1990s rugby league footballer
Garen Ewing (born 1969), English illustrator, designer and most notably a comic creator
Alan Garen, American geneticist and biologist
Jean-Pierre Garen (1932–2004), French physician and novelist
John E. Garen, American economist
Micah Garen, photographer, documentary filmmaker and writer

Other uses
House of Garen, the ruling hereditary dynasty of the Ajuran Sultanate
Garen, Minnesota, United States, an abandoned townsite

See also
Karen (disambiguation)
Karen (name)